This is the list of cathedrals in Angola.

Roman Catholic 
Cathedrals of the Roman Catholic Church in Angola:
 Cathedral of Our Lady of Fatima in Benguela
 Cathedral of Our Lady Queen of the World in Cabinda City
 Cathedral of St. Anne in Caxito
 Cathedral of Our Lady of the Conception in Dundo
 Cathedral of Our Lady of the Conception in Huambo
 Cathedral of St. Lawrence in Kuito
 Cathedral of the Holy Saviour in Luanda
 Cathedral of St. Joseph in Lubango
 Cathedral of Our Lady of Assumption Lwena
 Cathedral of Our Lady of the Assumption in Malanje
 Cathedral of Our Lady of the Conception in M'banza-Kongo
 Cathedral of Our Lady of Fatima in Menongue
 Cathedral of St. Peter in Moçâmedes
 Cathedral of St. John the Baptist in Ndalatando
 Cathedral of Our Lady of Victories in Ondjiva
 Cathedral of Our Lady of the Assumption in Saurímo
 Cathedral of Our Lady of the Conception in Sumbe
 Cathedral of Our Lady of the Assumption in Uíge
 Cathedral of St. Francis of Assisi in Viana

See also
List of cathedrals
Christianity in Angola

References

Catholic Church in Angola
Angola
Roman Catholic cathedrals in Angola
Cathedrals in Angola
Cathedrals
Cathedrals